For French universities, see:

Lists of universities in France
List of universities and colleges in France

See also
Grandes écoles

Education in France